Attorney General Garland may refer to:

Augustus Hill Garland (1832–1899), Attorney General of the United States
John Garland (Australian politician) (1862–1921), Attorney General of New South Wales
Merrick Garland (born 1952), Attorney General of the United States